Drakelow is a civil parish in the South Derbyshire district of Derbyshire, England.  The parish contains six listed buildings that are recorded in the National Heritage List for England.  All the listed buildings are designated at Grade II, the lowest of the three grades, which is applied to "buildings of national importance and special interest".  The major building in the parish had been Drakelow Hall until it was demolished in 1934.  The listed buildings consist of two farmhouses, and surviving structures associated with the hall.


Buildings

References

Citations

Sources

 

Lists of listed buildings in Derbyshire